Le Rustique is a brand of French cheese owned by the Compagnie des Fromages et RichesMonts (CF&R). 
Le Rustique was created in 1975 in Normandy, France with a recipe of camembert. The brand then launched other soft cheeses including brie, camembert light and coulommiers. Le Rustique is sold in France and over 60 other countries, it is best known for its camembert and brie but also commercializes hard cheese slices and raclette cheese.

History 
 1975: Creation of the Le Rustique brand 
 1977: Le Rustique is #1 of up-market camemberts
 1980: First TV commercial for Le Rustique in France. Le Grand Rustique 1 kg is awarded the gold medal at the Concours Général Agricole (CGA) – a competitive agricultural show in France
 1985: Le grand Rustique is awarded the gold medal at the CGA by the international jury and the silver medal by the French jury 
 1987: Launch of the coulommiers Le Rustique. 
 1988: Launch of the camembert Le Rustique light
 1991: The camembert Le Rustique is awarded the gold medal at the CGA
 1994: Camembert and coulommiers are both awarded the gold medal at the CGA.
 1996: Change of identity for Le Rustique: the horse-drawn carriage changes direction and the vichy slightly changes color.
 2004: Launch of the double cream camembert (60% fat) and the « petit brie » 500g
 2008: Launch of the « petit camembert » 150g et billboarding about « The spring »
 2009: New brand signature "Le Rustique, le goût de l'authentique"
 2010: Launch of the "pointe de brie" Le Rustique and Munster Le Rustique. Launch of Le Rustique slices in Germany. 
 2012: Launch of the first raclette cheeses Le Rustique in Germany. 
 2013: Launch of the camembert 8 portions Le Rustique

Le Rustique range of cheese 

 Camembert Le Rustique 250g
 Coulommiers Le Rustique 350g
 Camembert Le Rustique au lait 1/2 écrémé 250g
 Petit camembert Le Rustique 150g
 Camembert 8 portions Le Rustique 240g
 Pointe de brie Le Rustique 200g
 Le Grand Rustique 1 kg
 Le Grand Rustique 1 kg Light
 Brie Le Rustique 2.5 kg 
 Le petit munster Le Rustique 200g 
 Le Rustique Crémerin de Moselle 200g
 Le Rustique Tomme Fruitée 280g

References

External links 
 Le Rustique UK
 Le Rustique France

French cheeses
Cow's-milk cheeses